"God of Revival" is a song by Bethel Music, Brian Johnson and Jenn Johnson, which was released as the lead single from Bethel Music's twelfth live album, Revival's in the Air (2020), on February 7, 2020. The song was written by Brian Johnson and Phil Wickham. Brian Johnson also collaborated on the production of the single with Joel Taylor.

"God of Revival" peaked at number 22 on the US Hot Christian Songs chart.

Background
On February 3, 2020, Bethel Music announced that "God of Revival" will be released on February 7, 2020, as the lead single to their album of the same name, revealing the cover artwork, and availing the song for pre-save on Spotify. The live version of the song was recorded at Bethel Church, featuring Brian and Jenn Johnson as worship leaders, was released on February 7, with Bethel also announcing that the album will be released later in the year.

Bethel Music released a song story video, in which Brian Johnson was on a video-call with Phil Wickham, a co-writer on "God of Revival". They spoke about the heart and message behind the song, as well as the impact of the live recording on Wickham when he had heard for the first time, with Wickham sharing that he had received the recording while on a run and stopped on a sidewalk as the bridge began with "Come awaken," and started to cry.

On December 22, 2020, Bethel Music had announced via Daily Play MPE that "God of Revival" would be slated to impact Christian radio on February 5, 2021.

Composition

Commercial performance
"God of Revival" debuted at number 31 on the US Hot Christian Songs chart dated February 22, 2021, concurrently charting at No. 5 on the Christian Digital Song Sales chart. It went on to peak at number 22 on the chart, and spent a total of twenty-four non-consecutive weeks on Hot Christian Songs Chart.

Music videos
Bethel Music released the live music video of "God of Revival" with Brian and Jenn Johnson leading the song during the WorshipU 2019 conference held at Bethel Church through their YouTube channel on February 7, 2020. Bethel Music then released another live music video recorded at Heaven Come conference featuring Brian and Jenn Johnson leading the song in worship alongside Phil Wickham.

Track listing

Charts

Release history

Other versions
 Phil Wickham released his own version of the song on his eighth studio album, Hymn of Heaven (2021).

References

External links
  on PraiseCharts
 

2020 singles
2020 songs
Bethel Music songs
Songs written by Phil Wickham